Eric Hoffman may refer to:

Eric Hoffman (fl. 1980s–2000s), founding member of American death metal band Deicide (band)
Eric Von Hoffman (fl. 2010s), also credited as Eric Hoffman, comedy writer with Upright Citizens Brigade and Mr. Show with Bob and David, screenwriter of Girlfriend's Day

See also
Erik Hoffmann (born 1981), Namibian bicycle racer
Erika Hoffman (fl. 1980s–1990s), British actress
Erik Huffman (fl. 2000s), contestant on the television show Survivor (see List of Survivor (American TV series) contestants)